Kim Deok-pal (born 23 January 1942) is a South Korean boxer. He competed in the men's middleweight event at the 1964 Summer Olympics. At the 1964 Summer Olympics, he lost to Ion Monea of Romania.

References

1942 births
Living people
South Korean male boxers
Olympic boxers of South Korea
Boxers at the 1964 Summer Olympics
Place of birth missing (living people)
Asian Games medalists in boxing
Boxers at the 1962 Asian Games
Boxers at the 1966 Asian Games
Asian Games gold medalists for South Korea
Medalists at the 1962 Asian Games
Medalists at the 1966 Asian Games
Middleweight boxers